John Dilg (born 1945) is an American painter based in the Midwest. He is known for idiosyncratic landscapes created within a pared-down visual vocabulary that draws on memory, imagination, vernacular artifacts, and folk-art and art historical sources. Critics describe them as archetypal, dreamlike ruminations on place, nature and its fragility, the collective unconscious, and mystical storytelling. 

Dilg's work belongs to several public collections, including those of the Museum of Contemporary Art Chicago, Figge Art Museum, Museu d'Art Contemporani Vicente Aguilera Cerni (Spain) and Arkansas Arts Center, and has been reviewed in Art in America, The New York Times, Hyperallergic, New Art Examiner, The Boston Globe, and HuffPost. Critic John Yau wrote that Dilg's landscapes "arise out of the collision of observation and memory, things seen and the history of painting remembered," and evoke an "otherworldly hush and reverence." Curator Terri C. Smith wrote, "Dilg makes objects that are at once naïve and sophisticated, familiar and enigmatic. The tension in the paintings between known and unknown, fine art and found art along with their small scale encourages a very intimate, personal viewing experience." 

Dilg has been awarded fellowships from the National Endowment for the Arts, Ragdale Foundation and Yaddo Foundation, and received a Fulbright Grant. He was a professor in the School of Art and Art History at the University of Iowa for over four decades, before retiring as Professor Emeritus in 2017. Dilg lives in Iowa City, and is married to Jan Weissmiller, poet and co-owner of Prairie Lights Books.

Early life and career 
Dilg was born in Evanston, Illinois in 1945 and spent his childhood in the Chicago-area with summers in rural Iowa. He earned a BFA degree in painting and filmmaking at Rhode Island School of Design (1969) and studied at the Lalit Kala Akademi  in India (1971–2) through a Fulbright Scholarship. In 1973, during a Yaddo artist residency, he met artist and future mentor Byron Burford, who recruited him to teach at the University of Iowa.

Dilg's early career included solo exhibitions at Roy Boyd Gallery in Chicago (1978–83) and group shows at the Smithsonian Institution, Butler Institute of American Art, Joslyn Art Museum, Indianapolis Museum of Art, and N.A.M.E. Gallery, among others. His earliest work consisted of large, gestural, Abstract Expressionist canvasses. By the 1980s, his paintings featured more regular, dark lines separating abstract planes of color that engaged the picture edges; writers compared them to the work of Richard Diebenkorn and (despite their abstraction) to the quirkier Chicago Imagists. In the late 1980s, Dilg began a decade-long shift toward more restrained flat surfaces and simpler, centralized compositions. A solo exhibition at the Evanston Art Center (1996) marked his transition from purely formal concerns towards narrative and vaguely referential forms. This work gradually led to greater opportunities and attention, including representation (Luise Ross Gallery) and group shows (e.g., Andrea Rosen Gallery, Sikkema Jenkins & Co. and Jeff Bailey Gallery) in New York City and elsewhere.

Moving into the 2000s, Dilg was producing small, exactingly composed paintings of iconic, glyph-like forms that ranged from fully abstract shapes to barely recognizable animals and landscape elements, as in Hide (2001); New York Times critic Ken Johnson described them as exuding "a modest archetypal mystery." This work increasingly referenced vernacular sources, reflecting Dilg's interests in the function of the souvenir as a carrier of recollected times, events and stories.

Mature work and reception 
By 2006, Dilg committed fully to a spare landscape motif that engages its subject less in the historical sense than as a trope to metaphorically record and convey his relationship with the land. This work brings together diverse sources and precedents in a singular, personal vision: 19th-century chromolithography, Japanese woodcuts and Early Renaissance landscapes, folk or self-taught art, vintage postcards and game boards, thrift store paint-by-number waterfall paintings, handmade signs. His interest in tourist, souvenir and folk-art sources stems from his desire to recover the immediacy, sense of wonder and discovery, and uncanniness of such imagery—qualities that are often trained out of professional artists. 

Dilg's carefully chosen and composed pictorial elements often tap into the primal power of archetypal subjects: waterfalls and gorges (e.g., On Another Planet, 2012), towering sequoia forests and evergreens, and formations like Yosemite's Half Dome that evoke the American West of 19th-century artists like Albert Bierstadt and Thomas Moran, as well as the Gothic, moonlit landscapes of German Romantics, such as Caspar David Friedrich. He paints them with a flat, dry, scumbled application, seamlessly layering color gradations over charcoal-line drawings while allowing the canvas weave to show through in an almost pixelated fashion for added physical presence. His technique often reveals a hint of underpainting, creating a halo-effect around his forms. Dilg works with a subtly shifting, limited palette of celadon greens, pale blues, and sandy or greyed browns that has been described as evoking Midwest prairies, the veiled light created by misty Pacific Northwest rains, and deep geologic time.
	
New York Times critic Roberta Smith termed Dilg's small-scaled paintings "cartoon-visionary landscapes." Others characterize them as simultaneously spiritual and "quasi-mystical," enigmatic, elegant and whimsical. Boston Globe critic Cate McQuaid wrote that their "almost pictographic simplicity" and "incantatory energy" pulls viewers "into an intimate, low-key exchange, quiet and deeply felt," yet also suggests monumental forms and vast pictorial space. Several reviewers note that in addition to a sense of deliberation and solitude (e.g., I Felt So Symbolic Yesterday (C.C.), 2016), humor often emerges in his work through a single, odd detail or element, as in Natural Wonder (2007) or Headdress (2011), in which a dominant rock formation transforms, respectively, into an enormous torso or head.

Writers John Yau and Steven Zevitas suggest that the late-career, national recognition Dilg has received was long overdue, with the delay a likely result of his (in Yau's words) residing in a "fly-over state." In the 2000s, Dilg has had solo exhibitions at the Rhodes College (Memphis) and galleries including Regina Rex and Luise Ross (2000–11) in New York, Taymour Grahne (London/New York), Steven Zevitas (Boston), Devening Projects (Chicago), Tory Folliard (Milwaukee), and Schmidt Contemporary Art (St. Louis), among others. He has upcoming exhibitions in fall 2019 at the Figge Art Museum and Steve Turner Gallery (Los Angeles).

Exhibitions

Selected Solo Exhibitions  
 2023: Leaving the New World, Galerie Eva Presenhuber, Vienna, AT 
 2021: Flight Path, Eva Presenhuber, New York, NY, US
 2020: Recurring Dreams, online, Taymour Grahne Gallery, London, UK
 2019: Arterial Resources, 10-year survey, Figge Museum of Art, Davenport, IA, US 
 2019: Features, Steve Turner Gallery, Los Angeles, CA, US
 2018: Deep Water Prairie, Devening Projects, Chicago, IL, US  
 2016: Natural Memory, Taymour Grahne, New York, NY, US  
 2013: This Land is Your Land, Steven Zevitas Gallery, Boston, MA, US  
 2012: In Another World, Clough-Hanson Gallery, Rhodes College, Memphis, TN, US  
 2011: Primitive Pets, Luise Ross Gallery, New York, NY, US  
 2008: Recent Work, Schmidt Contemporary Art, St. Louis, MO, US  
 2007: Natural Re-Visions, Luise Ross Gallery, New York, NY, US  
 2004: Recent Work, Schmidt Contemporary Art, St. Louis, MO, US  
 2002: Recent Work, Luise Ross Gallery, New York, NY, US  
 2000: Recent Work, Luise Ross Gallery, New York, NY, US

Additional professional activities 
In addition to his teaching career at the University of Iowa, Dilg has been a visiting artist at more than forty institutions, including the University of Chicago, University of Pennsylvania, Sarah Lawrence College, Stanford University, and Yale University. He has also collaborated with the poets Marvin Bell, Lyn Hejinian, and Tomaz Salamun on letterpress broadsides, and with poet Timothy Donnelly, on the book Die neue Sicht der Dinge (2008).

References

External links 
John Dilg, University of Iowa profile

20th-century American painters
Landscape artists
Artists from Chicago
Artists from Iowa
Rhode Island School of Design alumni
University of Iowa faculty
1945 births
Living people
21st-century American painters